Backgrounding is an intermediate stage sometimes used in cattle production which begins after weaning and ends upon placement in a feedlot.  Background feeding relies more heavily on forage (e.g., pasture, hay) in combination with grains to increase a calf's weight by several hundred pounds and to build up immunity to diseases before it enters a feedlot. Some cattle operations specialize in backgrounding.

See also 
 Cattle § Terminology

References 

Cattle